Facelina fusca is a species of sea slug, an aeolid nudibranch, a marine gastropod mollusc in the family Facelinidae.

Distribution
This species has been reported from the Mediterranean Sea.

References

Facelinidae
Gastropods described in 1966